Thomas or Tom Poole may refer to:

Thomas Poole (academic), law professor at LSE
Thomas Poole (MP), member of Parliament for Cirencester, 1571 and 1572
Thomas Poole (tanner) (1766–1837), English tanner, Radical philanthropist, and essayist
Thomas Bell Poole (1818–1865), American criminal
Thomas Henry Poole (1860–1919), British-born architect who designed buildings in New York City
Thomas Slaney Poole (1873–1927), South Australian lawyer
Tom Poole (barrister) (1935–2017), first blind person in Britain to train and practice as a barrister
Tom Poole (colorist), colorist at Company 3
Tom Poole (footballer), English 19th-century footballer

See also
Tommy Pool (1935–1990), American sport shooter